Wideric (or ; died before 923) was a Frankish nobleman and the count of the Bidgau (pagusBedensis) and held the rights of a count within the city of Trier. He received also the advocacy of the Abbey of Saint Rumbold at Mechelen from Charles III, King of West Francia. From 915 or 916, he was the count palatine of Lotharingia. He was the founder of the House of Ardennes.

Medieval historians have been unable to precisely pin down Wigeric's origins or rise to power. He possessed lands in the region of Bitburg, in the middle Moselle valley, in the Gutland, the western Eifel, and the Meuse region.

At the death of Louis the Child, the Lotharingians rejected the suzerainty of Conrad I and elected Charles of France as their king. At the time, the military authority in Lotharingia was assigned to Count Reginar I of Hainaut (died 915), but at his death it fell to Wigeric, who became count palatine, exercising as such the military authority in Lotharingia.

Wigeric founded the monastery of Hastière (French: L'abbaye d'Hastière) now in Hastière-par-delà(fr), of which he also assumed the advocacy.

There is no historical trace of Wigeric after 919: he probably died between 916 and 919, and was buried in the monastery of Hastière.

Family and descendants 
Wigeric's first wife Eva died, leaving him a widower. He then married Cunigunda, daughter of Ermentrude, daughter of Louis II of France, and therefore a descendant of Charlemagne. Their children were:

Gozlin (911–942), count of Bidgau, married Uda of Metz, father of:
Godfrey the Prisoner
Adalberon, Archbishop of Reims
Frederick (912–978), count of Bar, the duke of Upper Lorraine from 959
Adalberon (died 962), bishop of Metz
Gilbert (died 964), count in the Ardennes
Sigebert (fl. c. 942)
Siegfried, (c.922–998), count of Luxembourg

Wigeric and Cunigunda were the founders of the dynasty of the House of Ardennes. Its three branches, Ardennes-Verdun, Ardennes-Bar, and Ardennes-Luxembourg, dominated Lorraine for a century and a half. The Ardennes family extended from Laon and Reims to Trier and Cologne, from Metz and Verdun to Liège and Antwerp. Its descendants were to appear in the following positions: 
 Dukes of Upper and Lower Lorraine (959–1046 and 1012–1100, respectively)
 Bishops of Metz (929–1072)
 Bishops of Laon (977–1031)
 Bishops of Reims (969–989)
 Bishops of Verdun (984–988)
 Bishops of Trier (1004–1015)

Primary sources 
 
 He is first attested in 899 as count Widiacus in a charter of King Zwentibold in Trier .
 A Wigericus, with comital rights in Trier, appears in a diploma of Louis IV dated 19 September 902: MGH Diplomata.
 He is usually identified with Widricus, count of the Bidgau, of a charter of Saint-Maximin dated 1 January 909 .
 He appears in a diploma of Charles III (between 911 and 915) as Windricus and his son Adalberon and he received the fiefs and the advocacy of the abbeys of Saint Rumbolds at Mechelen and Hastière. The margrave of Neustria, Robert, and Reginar, margrave in Lotharingia, gave their consent.
 He appears for the first time with the title "count palatine" in a diploma of Charles as well, this time as Widricus, dated 19 January 916 at Herstal .

Footnotes

References

Further reading
 Van Droogenbroeck, F. J., 'Paltsgraaf Wigerik van Lotharingen, inspiratiebron voor de legendarische graaf Witger in de Vita Gudilae', Eigen Schoon en De Brabander 93 (2010) 113-136.

House of Ardennes
Counts Palatine of Lotharingia
Counts of Bidgau
Year of birth unknown
910s deaths
Year of death uncertain